Oliva amethystina guttata is a subspecies of Oliva amethystine, a sea snail, a marine gastropod mollusk in the family Olividae, the olives.

References

 Tursch B., Germain L. & Greifeneder D. (1986). Studies on Olividae. IV. Oliva annulata Gmelin, 1791 (of authors): a confusion of species. Indo-Malayan Zoology. 3: 189-216

amethystina guttata
Gastropods described in 1840